Mohammad Mustafa is an Indian politician from Andhra Pradesh. He is a member of Andhra Pradesh Legislative Assembly for the Guntur East (Assembly constituency). He is a member of the regional political YSR Congress Party which won the assembly elections.

References

Living people
YSR Congress Party politicians
Andhra Pradesh politicians
Year of birth missing (living people)
Andhra Pradesh MLAs 2019–2024